V23, or similar, may refer to:
 ITU V.23, a modem standard
 Fokker V.23, a German experimental fighter aircraft of the 1910s
 UV-23 Scout, an American prototype utility aircraft of the 1970s 
 v23, a British graphic design studio founded by Vaughan Oliver